Shehu Umar Ibn Muhammad also known as Shehu Sanda Kyarimi, CBE, CMG, KBE, was Shehu of Dikwa between 1922 and 1937 and Shehu of Borno from 1937 to 1967.

Reign
Shehu Umar Ibn Muhammad (son of Shehu Kyari of Borno) also known as Shehu Sanda Kyarimi, was Shehu of Dikwa between 1922 and 1937 and Shehu of Borno from 1937 to 1967. In 1955, he attended the great durbar in Kaduna during the visit of Elizabeth II. The same year, he went on pilgrimage to Mecca.

Decorations
In 1943, he was appointed CBE (Commander of the Order of the British Empire), on the nomination of Bernard Henry Bourdillon. In 1949, he was made CMG (Companion of the Order of Saint Michael and Saint George), on the recommendation of Commissioner Patterson. Finally, in 1960, the governor of Northern Nigeria, Gawain Bell recommended him for appointment as a Knight Commander of the Order of the British Empire, so that he became Sir Umar.

References

Bibliography

Sheriff, Bosoma, Muhammad Fannami, and Abba Rufai Tijani, Functions of Shettima Kanuribe: Instances in the Shehu of Borno’s Palace (Maiduguri: Desktop Investment Ltd., 2011).

Dynasty

Royalty of Borno
1967 deaths
Year of birth missing